Night Warriors may refer to:
Night Warriors – Darkstalkers' Revenge, an arcade game in the Darkstalkers series
Night Warriors: Darkstalkers' Revenge (anime), an animated adaptation of it.
Night Warriors (novel), the first novel in Graham Masterton's Night Warriors series